The AEP Building is a  skyscraper in Downtown Columbus, Ohio. It was completed in 1983 and has 31 floors. Abramovitz, Harris & Kingsland designed the building following a modernist architectural style. The AEP Building is the 8th tallest building in Columbus. It has served as the headquarters of the American Electric Power (AEP) since the company relocated from New York City in 1983.

At the front of the building are two sculptures created by George Greenamyer. The sculptures were turbine rotors, which came from the former Philo Power Plant in Philo, Ohio and the Twin Branch Power Plant in Mishawaka, Indiana.

See also
List of tallest buildings in Columbus, Ohio

References

Emporis
Skyscraperpage

External links
 

Skyscraper office buildings in Columbus, Ohio
Buildings in downtown Columbus, Ohio
Office buildings completed in 1983
American Electric Power